Attaboy or Atta Boy can refer to:
 Atta Boy, a 1926 American silent film
 Attaboy (bar), a craft cocktail bar in New York City
 "Attaboy", a song on Perfect Velvet by Red Velvet
 "Attaboy", a song on The Goat Rodeo Sessions by Yo-Yo Ma, Stuart Duncan, Edgar Meyer and Chris Thile

See also 
 Attaboy, Sam!